Galle is a town in southwestern Sri Lanka.

Galle may also refer to:

Galle (surname)
Galle District, in southern Sri Lanka
Gallé, Mali, a small town in Southwestern Mali
Galle (lunar crater)
Galle (Martian crater), also known as the "happy face crater"
2097 Galle, an asteroid

See also 

 
 
 Galle Trilingual Inscription, a stone tablet erected in 1411 in Galle, Sri Lanka
 Gall (disambiguation)
 Galley (disambiguation)
 Galli (disambiguation)
 Gally (disambiguation)
 Gaul (disambiguation)